The Ferrari F399 was the car that the Ferrari team competed with for the 1999 Formula One World Championship. The chassis was designed by Rory Byrne, Giorgio Ascanelli, Aldo Costa, Marco Fainello, Willem Toet, and Nikolas Tombazis, with Ross Brawn playing a vital role in leading the production of the car as the team's technical director and Paolo Martinelli assisted by Giles Simon leading the engine design and operations. 

The F399 was almost identical to the previous season's F300, with small detail changes like a new front wing, wheel tethers, waisted sidepods, and an improved exhaust system and the use of Bridgestone tyres with four grooves instead of three. It was initially driven by Michael Schumacher and Eddie Irvine, with Mika Salo substituting for Schumacher when he broke his leg at Silverstone. Ferrari used Marlboro logos, except at the French, British, and Belgian Grands Prix.

Although the team's quest to win their first drivers' title since  was halted by Schumacher's injury and the faster speed of the McLaren MP4/14, they managed to clinch their first constructors' title since .

Technical specifications 

The chassis of the Ferrari F399 was almost identical to its predecessor, the F300. It had a reinforced carbon-fibre and honeycomb monocoque structure that could protect the driver from most accidents. The engine was an MR(Mid-engine, Rear wheel drive) layout.

Changes from the F300 were that the front wing was slightly modified, the sidepods were waisted, and the exhaust was improved in order so that Ferrari could push harder in their fight with McLaren.

The suspension for the front and rear areas of the car were the pushrod/double wishbone suspension systems that still exist today in Formula 1. The car also has wheel tethers on each wheel to prevent the tires from hitting the driver's head, a regulation that is still used by Formula One to this day.

The engine is an 790 BHP (552 KW), 80-degree 3.0 litre V10 engine manufactured by Ferrari called the Tipo048/B/C. It also bears a 7-shift transmission that was in all Formula One car until the teams started using 8-shift transmission gearboxes since the 2014 season began.

The car also used Shell fuel to power its engine while the tyres, which were designed by Bridgestone, now had 4 grooves on all 4 tyres instead of 3 grooves on the front tyres. The new tyres with four grooves were a new rule change for the 1999 season and onward in the V10 era of the sport.

1999 season 

Early in the season the car showed huge performance with Irvine winning the opening round in Australia while Schumacher collected podiums along with wins at Imola and Monaco, thereby making Ferrari a serious threat to the McLaren duo of Mika Häkkinen and David Coulthard throughout much of the 1999 season.

While Irvine would also go on to win back-to-back victories at Austria and Germany along with the inaugural Malaysian Grand Prix, Häkkinen and McLaren had shown great consistency over the season despite 4 retirements over the course of the season. Ferrari's championship aspirations also took a beating after Schumacher had broken his leg at Silverstone, resulting in Ferrari briefly replacing him with Mika Salo during the midway point of the season. Salo performed well, handing victory to Irvine in Germany and finishing third at Monza.

The team were briefly excluded from Malaysia after the stewards found out that their bargeboards were illegal, meaning that Häkkinen and McLaren were effectively handed their respective championships by default. However, Ferrari managed to appeal against the FIA's decision in court and both of their drivers were subsequently reinstated.

After the season had ended, Häkkinen had claimed the driver's title by two points from Irvine while Ferrari claimed the constructor's title by four points from McLaren.

Complete Formula One results
(key) (results in bold indicate pole position; results in italics indicate fastest lap)

References

AUTOCOURSE 1999–2000, Henry, Alan (ed.), Hazleton Publishing Ltd. (1999) 
"Malaysian GP 1999. Full Race – Irvine Wins at Schumi's Comeback." MAXF1net, 19 Sept. 2017
"The Farce of the 1999 Title Decider." Motor Sport Magazine, 27 Apr. 2016
Murphy, Luke. "Gallery: Ferrari Launch 'Michael 50' Exhibition." FormulaSpy.com, 3 Jan. 2019.
S, Alexander. "Ferrari F399 - A Car That Ended the Drought for the Italian Team." SnapLap, 3 Apr. 2019.
“Ferrari F1-2000.” Ferrari F1-2000 - F1technical.Net, www.f1technical.net/f1db/cars/832/ferrari-f1-2000. 
Grandprix.com - First & fastest: The original online F1 news service. “Testing Intensifies as New Cars Appear.” Latest Formula 1 Breaking News - Grandprix.com, www.grandprix.com/ns/ns02305.html.

External links

F399
1999 Formula One season cars
Formula One championship-winning cars